Arctic Escape is a puzzle video game developed and published by Teyon for Nintendo DS and iOS in 2011. It was ported to Japan for release under the name  on November 14, 2012.

Reception

The game received above-average reviews on both platforms according to the review aggregation website Metacritic.

References

External links
 

2011 video games
DSiWare games
IOS games
Nintendo DS games
Puzzle video games
Single-player video games
Teyon games
Video games about birds
Video games developed in Poland
Video games set in the Arctic